Of June is the first EP by American electronic music project Owl City. It was uploaded by Adam Young to his Myspace page on August 29, 2007. The EP was released digitally on December 16, 2008.

Following the surprise success of Owl City's second studio album, Ocean Eyes, Of June was pressed and re-released by Universal Republic on March 30, 2010.

Background
Of June was recorded in July 2007. Young released the EP on MySpace which resulted in garnering an online fan base.

Critical reception

Of June was generally received with positive reviews. Jared Johnson of AllMusic stated, "His lyrics are poetry for a surprising number of souls who, like him, seem to have grown tired of the standard Top 40 fare." He praised the song "Hello Seattle" calling the track, "the heart of the album," whilst also remarking, "each song has elements of brilliance." Zach Hall of Jesus Freak Hideout complimented songs such as "Hello Seattle" and "Fuzzy Blue Lights".

Track listing

Notes
"Hello Seattle" was later re-recorded and included on the band's second studio album Ocean Eyes.

Charts

References

2007 debut EPs
Owl City albums